Temple University, Japan Campus (Abbreviated: TUJ, Japanese: テンプル大学ジャパンキャンパス) is an international campus of Temple University (located in Philadelphia, Pennsylvania, United States). TUJ has classrooms and student facilities in Setagaya-ku, Tokyo. It is the oldest and largest foreign university in Japan, with an estimated 2,051 matriculated students, of which approximately 60% come from nearly 70 countries around the world (approximately 40% are from Japan).

The university offers many degree programs, including an A.A., B.A., M.S.Ed., Ed.D., Ph.D., MiM, and LL.M., and offers semester and year-long study abroad programs for U.S. undergraduate and law students. In addition, TUJ offers non-degree programs including English-language (ESL), continuing education for adults, and corporate education. As of 2022, TUJ enrolls 2,071 degree-seeking students: 1,840+ undergraduates and 230+ postgraduates (8 Music Therapy, 21 MiM, 70 Law, 131 Graduate College of Education). Non-degree enrollment totals are 2,155+, including 1,205 Academic English Program students and 750+ Continuing Education students.

History

Establishment
Temple University, Japan Campus (TUJ) was established in 1982 in Shiba-Koen, Minato-ku. It was the first campus of an American university in Japan, originally operating with a series of business partners. The Temple Japan Campus has had long periods of financial uncertainty. Less than five years after TUJ opened, it was in "financial shambles". In 1983, a business partner stole tuition money, leaving TUJ financially unstable. A new business partner was found through the year 1992, but continuing weakness in the Japanese economy caused another budget crisis, and the Japan Campus almost closed. In 1996, TUJ withdrew from the partnership with its Japanese partner and became a wholly owned, subsidized operation of Temple University. During this time, the campus was relocated to Minami-Azabu, Minato-ku, where it operated until its new campus at Showa Women's University completed construction.

On August 14, 2019, TUJ officially opened its new campus, located on grounds of Showa Women's University in Setagaya-ku.

Early years

At its inception, the university offered an Intensive English Language Program (IELP) in its Tokyo campus, as well as a Master of Education (M.Ed.) program in both its Tokyo and Osaka centers. Within the next decade it launched an Undergraduate Program, a Doctor of Education (Ed.D.) in TESOL program and a Master of Laws (LL.M.) program, as well as expanded its IELP program to its Osaka center. In 1996, upon becoming a wholly owned operation of Temple University, TUJ launched the Executive MBA program – the first program of its kind in Japan – while simultaneously re-launching its Open College Program and Globalization Program as the Continuing Education and Corporate Education programs, respectively.

Gaining its current status
In 2005 the Japanese Ministry of Education, Culture, Sports, Science and Technology (MEXT) officially designated Temple University, Japan Campus as the first Foreign University in Japan becoming the first recognized foreign university operating in Japan (外国大学日本校, gaikoku daigaku nihonkō). This gave TUJ recognition amongst not only American Universities, but also Japanese Universities, making credits and degrees from the university accredited in both countries.

Partnerships and agreements
TUJ has established Credit Exchange Programs with Musashi University, Toyo University Faculty of Regional Development Studies, and the School of Arts and Letters at Meiji University. In addition, the university has signed Memorandums of Understanding with both Toyo and National Taipei Universities, and has established the Musashi Temple RED Program for junior high and high school students who plan to study abroad or at a foreign university in Japan.

Campus

Locations
Temple University, Japan Campus consists of two locations in both Tokyo. Within Tokyo, TUJ operates at a campus located at Showa Women's University in Setagaya-ku.

New campus project
Showa Women's University (SWU) and Temple University, Japan Campus (TUJ) have agreed to share a campus at SWU's current location in Setagaya-ku, Tokyo. TUJ formally opened its new campus on August 14, 2019.

Facilities
TUJ has six computer labs equipped with Windows, Mac and Unix computers; a library with over 50,000 books and access to an extensive collection of journal subscriptions; a career development office; counseling; a post-production studio with both video-editing and professional sound recording capabilities; and a teaching and learning center providing free tutoring to students.

Student housing
TUJ offers guaranteed housing for all first semester international students. The school operates three unisex dormitories located in Tokyo and Kanagawa and offers a limited number of homestay options.

Academics

Degree programs

English program

Continuing Education

Corporate Education

Institute of Contemporary Asian Studies (ICAS)
Established in 2004, ICAS (formerly the Institute of Contemporary Japanese Studies) is an institute run by TUJ providing a platform for scholars worldwide to present their studies and facilitate academic discussions. It hosts about 30 lectures and symposiums each year, all open to the public and usually free of charge. Lecture topics – focusing on contemporary Asia as well as American-related affairs – range from politics, the economy, foreign and military affairs, cinema and pop culture, to healthcare systems and environmental issues. Participants include a wide range of individuals from the foreign and Japanese media, business, government and academic communities.

Student life

Students
Students attending TUJ come from approximately 60 countries around the world. In addition to Japan and the United States, TUJ has students from East and Southeast Asia, Russia, the Middle East, Africa, Latin America, and Europe.

Temple University, Japan Campus is able to sponsor visas for its international students and provides Japanese student identification cards, student discounts for train passes, assistance with mobile phone contracts, and other student-life related items.  Additionally, TUJ offers a number of options for students to study abroad in one of its sister campuses located around the world.

Office of Student Services and Engagement
The Office of Student Services and Engagement provides assistance related to daily student life to TUJ's student body. Additionally, the OSSE also provides assistance with the visa application process, coordinating Financial Aid/GI Bill-related matters and housing. The OSSE also provides orientations to help students adapt to the academic and social life at TUJ. They also work with the Student Government and other student organizations to encourage social interaction among students with different backgrounds by creating events and activities that appeal to all TUJ students.

Student Government
The Student Government serves as the voice of the student body, and advocates for their needs as their elected representatives. The Student Government also organizes various events during the academic year to help promote active student life.

Clubs and Organizations
Student clubs and organizations are created and run by students and overseen by the Office of Student Services and Engagement (OSSE). These organizations help students identify others with similar interests, and promote friendship among students.

Community relations

Minato City
Temple University, Japan Campus takes part in several community-oriented activities, primarily in the form of volunteer or educational assistance. In partnership with the local Minato City government, TUJ has provided support to children and adults within the Minato area as part of their Agreement on Joint Activities established in 2006.

Culture and education
TUJ sends foreign students and staff to schools located in the Minato area to introduce their respective cultures. It also offers short-term programs for elementary and junior high school students and their teachers in an effort to improve English Education in Japan. In addition, the university periodically hosts lectures on the topic of contemporary Japan as part of the Minato City adult education program. The TUJ library is open to all Minato teachers and residents.

Events
Students, faculty and staff take part in various Minato City events each year, including; the Minato Citizen's Festival, the Konan Civic Center English Program and numerous Shrine Festivals in the area.

References

External links

 Temple University, Japan Campus official website
 Temple University website

1982 establishments in Japan
Commonwealth System of Higher Education
 
Foreign universities and colleges in Japan
Eastern Pennsylvania Rugby Union
Universities and colleges in Tokyo
Showa Women's University